Noël Alexandre, or Natalis Alexander in Latin (19 January 163921 August 1724) was a French theologian, author, and ecclesiastical historian.

Biography
Alexandre was born in Rouen, France.  In 1654, he joined the Dominicans in his hometown. Shortly after his ordination, he was appointed professor (first regent) of philosophy at the Couvent des Jacobins in Paris, where he was later buried.

The success of Alexandre's  subsequent lectures at the Sorbonne led to his selection by Jean-Baptiste Colbert as tutor to his son, Jacques Nicolas Colbert, afterwards archbishop of Rouen. Alexandre obtained the degree of doctor in divinity from the Sorbonne in 1675 and for twelve years taught philosophy, theology and ecclesiastical law to the members of the Saint-Jacques community. He played a prominent part in ecclesiastical affairs and preached several times before Louis XIV, who granted him an annual pension of 800 livres. He became provincial of his order in 1706, but was banished to Châtellerault in 1709 for having subscribed to the Jansenist Cas de conscience (1703), and was deprived of his pension in 1713 on account of his opposition to the bull Unigenitus. He died in Paris on 21 August 1724, aged 85, having lost his sight some time before owing to his strenuous literary activity. He was buried in the now-demolished church of the Couvent des Jacobins in Paris. His numerous works are still much valued by ecclesiastical students.

Bibliography
Selecta historiae ecclesiasticae capita, et in loca ejusdem insignia dissertationes historicae, chronologicae, dogmaticae (26 volumes, Paris, 1676–1686). This is Alexandre's best-known work. It was placed on the Index by Pope Innocent XI, on account of his bold defence of the Gallican claims.
Selecta historiae Veteris Testamenti capita, &c., (6 volumes, Paris 1689), is a history of the Old Testament. Of the numerous editions of Alexandre's ecclesiastical history the best is that of J. D. Mansi, which contains many valuable notes and additions (Lucca, 1749) and has been frequently reprinted.
 Theologia dogmatica et moralis secundum ordinem catechismi concilii Tridentini (10 volumes, Paris, 1694), This is Alexandre's principal contribution to theological literature, in which he clearly shows himself a disciple of the Thomist school.
Conformités des cérémonies chinoises avec l'idolatrie grecque et romaine and Sept lettres sur les cérémonies de la Chine (both published at Cologne in 1700) are interesting as they mark him out as a pioneer in the study of comparative religion.
Historia ecclesiastica veteris novique testamenti : ab orbe condito ad annum post Christum natum millesimum sexcentesimum Venturinus, 1734

References

Attribution:
 This article cites:
Catalogue complet des œuvres du Père Alexandre (Paris, 1716);
Quétif-Echard, Scriptores ordinis praedicatorum (Paris, 1719–1721), t. n. p. 810;
A. Vacant, Dict. de théologie (scholarly article by P . Mandounet, cols . 769–772)

Further reading
Coulon, Rémi, ‘Le P. Noël Alexandre. Contribution à l’histoire théologique et religieuse du XVIIIe siècle’, Revue des Sciences philosophiques et théologiques 6 (1912), pp. 49–80, 279–331.
Hänggi, Anton, Der Kirchenhistoriker Natalis Alexander (1639–1724) (Fribourg, 1955), the standard account for all biographical questions. 
Mercati, Angelo, ‘Intorno alla ‘Romanità’ di Natale Alexandre, O.P.’, Archivum Fratrum Praedicatorum 16 (1946), pp. 5–82.
Vecchi, Alberto, Correnti religiose nel Sei-Settecento veneto (Venice and Rome, 1962), pp. 348–351, on Alexandre's influence in Italy.
Waquet, Françoise, Le modèle français et l’Italie savante. Conscience de soi et perception de l’autre dans la République des Lettres (1660–1750) (Rome, 1989), pp. 84–85, ad indicem.
Grès-Gayer, Jacques M., Théologie et pouvoir en Sorbonne. La Faculté de Théologie de Paris et la Bulle ‘Unigenitus’ (Paris, 1991), pp. 22–23, 64, 97, 116, 212, 224.
Quantin, Jean-Louis, Le catholicisme classique et les Pères de l’Église. Un retour aux sources (1669–1713) (Paris, 1999), pp. 77, 82, 91-93, 95-96, 108, 112, 237, 241, 287, 348, 547, 550.
Gay, Jean-Pascal, ‘Laxisme et rigorisme: théologies ou cultures? Deux controverses au tournant du XVIIe siècle’, Revue des Sciences philosophiques et théologiques 87 (2003), pp. 525–547.
Grès-Gayer, Jacques M., D’un jansénisme à l’autre. Chroniques de Sorbonne, 1696-1713 (Paris, 2007), pp. 23, 145-146, 162, 173, 236, 241, 253, 259-260, 337-338, 350-351, 359, 463.
Quantin, Jean-Louis, ‘Entre Rome et Paris, entre histoire et théologie, les Selecta historiae ecclesiasticae capita du P. Noël Alexandre et les ambiguïtés de l’historiographie gallicane’, Mémoire dominicaine 20 (2007), pp. 67–100.

1639 births
1724 deaths
University of Paris alumni
Academic staff of the University of Paris
Writers from Rouen
17th-century French Catholic theologians
French Dominicans
French historians of religion